The 1899 Hong Kong Sanitary Board election was supposed to be held on 18 December 1899 for the two unofficial seats in the Sanitary Board of Hong Kong. Only persons on the jury lists of the year were eligible to vote. There were only two candidates therefore only 19 votes were cast as a formality.

Prior to the election, the issue of reconstitution of the Sanitary Board was intensively debated. A plebiscite of the British community based on the jury lists was held in June 1896, as to whether Sanitary Board should contain an official or unofficial majority. The Government refused to make any further constitutional changes however the election for unofficial members was not held until 1899.

Dr William Hartigan and James McKie were elected. They both resigned in April 1901 to protest that the Board was given too few powers.

References
 Endacott, G. B. Government and people in Hong Kong, 1841-1962 : a constitutional history Hong Kong University Press. (1964)

1899 elections in Asia
1899 in Hong Kong
Sanitary
Uncontested elections
December 1899 events